Lynden Christian Schools (abbreviated LCS), often referred to as Lynden Christian (LC), is a non-denominational private Christian school. The school educates 1200 students in Whatcom County, Washington, United States.

Admission Requirements 

 Academic ability and interest (minimum “C” average or better)
 Self-discipline and motivation
 Ability to establish priorities and carry them through
 Emotional maturity needed to adjust to a new language and culture
 Willingness to abide by the school code and United States laws
 A respect for the American culture and religious nature of this school

References

External links
 

High schools in Whatcom County, Washington
Private high schools in Washington (state)
Educational institutions established in 1910
Lynden, Washington
Private middle schools in Washington (state)
Private elementary schools in Washington (state)
1910 establishments in Washington (state)